Boothferry Park was a football stadium in Hull, England, which was home to Hull City A.F.C. from 1946 until 2002, when they moved to the KC Stadium.

In later years, financial constraints forced Hull City to allow Kwik Save and Iceland supermarkets to embed themselves into the stadium's structure. Parts of the ground were demolished in early 2008, more than five years after the last game was played there, and the remainder in 2011.



History

The planning years 

The ground was originally planned in 1929, and work began on the site from 1932 based near the Humber Estuary. Financial difficulties severely hampered this development, with the playing area and part of the terracing appearing over the following 12 months before work and progress ground to a halt. A proposal in 1939 for a sports stadium on the site was the catalyst for further development, as even though this threw up doubt for the original stadium plans, no suitable financial offer for the land was forthcoming, and instead the Hull City board enquired after, and were granted, a Football Association loan to the sum of £6,600. This meant the new ground would be ready for the opening of the 1941 season.

The onset of the Second World War was to again frustrate the development of the football ground, as during the war, the ground was used by the Home Guard, and was, for a period, used to repair tanks. This, not unexpectedly, had an adverse effect on the playing area – following the end of the war, the pitch was in very poor shape and prone to waterlogging.

Building materials were hard to come by in the post-war years for something as "frivolous" as a football stadium in the heavily bombed city, this and the state of the pitch meant that the ground was still not in a usable state by the 1945–46 season, so the club was forced to return to playing its matches at one of its former homes, the Boulevard, the then home of rugby league club, Hull F.C., one of the city's two major rugby league clubs.

Opening and continued construction

The ground was opened in August 1946, 17 years after its initial proposal, but only had planning permission for one stand along the west side with an upper cost limit of £17,000. The ground was still not fully completed and it became a race against time to make the stadium ready for its opening match against visiting Lincoln City. Twenty-thousand people gathered to watch the opening ceremony performed by the city's lord mayor. The teams were led onto the pitch by Sergeant JT "Tommy" Brooke riding a white horse. Sergeant Brooke was a detective and mounted officer in the Hull Police and was a veteran of the First World War and the Battle of the Somme where he was a machine gunner with the Royal Horse Guards.

By 1948 the attendance record had swelled to 40,179 as the stadium hosted visitors Middlesbrough in the FA Cup. The terracing embankments were raised and by February 1949 a ground and club record which still stands was hit – 55,019 turned out to watch Hull City play Manchester United. The locally famous Boothferry Halt opened in 1951.  The ground now had its own railway station, its first use being a fixture against Everton when six trains ran the football service between Paragon Station, Hull's central railway station and Boothferry Park. At the same time, work proceeded on the covering of the North Stand.

The East Terrace was the next to be covered, albeit with a temporary structure. This temporary structure was never replaced, and stood throughout the years of the ground. The popular East Terrace became known as the Kempton Stand after Kempton Road on the other side of the railway station. With the three stands completed, the ground was now suited to a floodlight installation. Two gantries housing 96 lamps were built, one on the west and one opposite on the east following a licence being granted. Although this lighting system was the envy of many clubs, advancements in stadium lighting came rapidly, and the system soon needed replacement. A six pylon system replaced the old gantries in 1963.

The new lights were used for the first time in 1964, using four of the six available, in an evening match against Barnsley which ended in a 7–0 win for the Tigers.

In 1965 a new South Stand was built over the Bunker's Hill Terrace. The new two-tiered structure included a propped cantilever roof, 2,500 seats in the upper tier and terracing for 4,000 more in the lower tier. The new stand was arguably the best stand at Boothferry Park, and a reminder of the golden days in the declining years to come.

On 20 March 1967, Boothferry Park hosted an FA Cup 2nd replay between Leeds United and Sunderland. Over 40,000 fans attended and Leeds United won 2–1. It was standard procedure in the pre penalty shoot-out days for 2nd and subsequent replays to be held on neutral grounds.

On 16 February 1972 Boothferry Park hosted a full international match between Northern Ireland and Spain. The result was drawn at 1–1.

The final football match to be staged at Boothferry Park saw Hull City lose 0–1 to Darlington in December 2002. The goal was scored by Simon Betts; it would be his only goal in Darlington colours.  Darlington goalkeeper Michael Ingham played in both the final match at Boothferry Park and the first match to be played at Hull City's new home (in Sunderland colours).

Boothferry Park was also the scene of a rugby league international when it hosted the first Ashes series test of the 1982 Kangaroo tour between Great Britain and Australia on 30 October. The Aussies ran in eight tries to nil in a 40–4 thrashing watched by a vocal crowd of 26,771.

In January 1990, the Taylor Report required all clubs in the top two divisions of English football to have an all-seater stadium by August 1994. Hull were in the Second Division by this stage, but their relegation at the end of the 1990–91 season meant that the club was not covered by these requirements. Attendances fell throughout the 1990s as Hull suffered a further relegation in 1996 and financial problems almost put the club out of business, with strained finances meaning that Boothferry Park was not properly maintained and fell into increasing disrepair. By 1998, however, a move to an all-seater stadium elsewhere was in the pipeline, and Hull left Boothferry Park in December 2002 after 56 years to play at the new Kingston Communications Stadium.

Rugby League
Boothferry Park hosted nine top grade rugby league matches, including five internationals, from 1980 to 1985.

Other than the five internationals, Boothferry Park also hosted a further five top grade rugby league games.

Demolition

Demolition of the ground eventually started on 10 January 2008, over five years after the final game was played there, and was completed during March. The North Stand and the terracing on the South and East Stands were eventually demolished in January 2010 after years of vandalism and arson attacks. Humberside Fire and Rescue Service had to be called out nearly 100 times during 2009 to deal with the situation.
The six floodlights that had dominated the West Hull skyline were finally dismantled in early 2011.

Records
The highest attendance before the new stand was built was 40,179 in 1948 when Hull City played Middlesbrough in the FA Cup. In 1949 55,019 witnessed the visit of Manchester United when the height of the terracing was increased. The biggest Scoring Game came in a friendly Match in 1950. When Hull City played Nuneaton Borough the score ended 8–6 to Hull City with the score having been 0–1 to Nuneaton Borough at halftime.

Nicknames 

The stadium became affectionately known by supporters as "Fer Ark" in its later days, due to the lack of finances for maintenance which meant that only those letters were illuminated on the large "boothFERry pARK" signage. Before this it had been known as "Bothferry Park" when one of the illuminated "O"s fell off.
It was also known simply as "BP".

References

External links

Boothferry Park on Worldstadia.com
 Demolition photographs
 More pictures of the ground
Photo Gallery of Boothferry Park

Defunct football venues in England
Defunct cricket grounds in England
Hull City A.F.C.
Sports venues in Kingston upon Hull
Cricket grounds in the East Riding of Yorkshire
Defunct sports venues in the East Riding of Yorkshire
Sports venues completed in 1946
Sports venues demolished in 2010
English Football League venues
Demolished sports venues in the United Kingdom